In mathematics, Lindelöf's lemma is a simple but useful lemma in topology on the real line, named for the Finnish mathematician Ernst Leonard Lindelöf.

Statement of the lemma

Let the real line have its standard topology. Then every open subset of the real line is a countable union of open intervals.

Generalized Statement 

Lindelöf's lemma is also known as the statement that every open cover in a second-countable space has a countable subcover (Kelley 1955:49). This means that every second-countable space is also  a Lindelöf space.

Proof of the generalized statement 
Consider an open cover, . To get prepared for the following deduction, we define two sets for convenience, .

A straight-forward but essential observation is that,  which is from the definition of base. (Here, we use the definition of "base" in M.A.Armstrong, Basic Topology, chapter 2, §1, i.e. a collection of open sets such that every open set is a union of members of this collection.) Therefore, we can get that,

where , and is therefore at most countable. Next, by construction, for each  there is some  such that . We can therefore write

completing the proof.

References

 J.L. Kelley (1955), General Topology, van Nostrand.
 M.A. Armstrong (1983), Basic Topology, Springer.

Covering lemmas
Lemmas
Topology